Aterpia chalybeia is a moth belonging to the family Tortricidae. The species was first described by Mark I. Falkovitsh in 1966.

It is native to Northern Europe.

References

Olethreutini